Joseph Hardstaff  (28 February 1935 – 22 November 2022) was an Air Commodore in the Royal Air Force and a first-class cricketer.

Joe Hardstaff was born in Kirkby-in-Ashfield, Nottinghamshire and was the third member in successive generations to represent his family in first-class cricket. His grandfather Joe Sr. and his father Joe Jr. both represented England and Nottinghamshire. His grandfather also stood as a first-class cricket umpire.

Hardstaff was commissioned into the Royal Air Force and rose to the rank of Air Commodore. He played cricket for the Free Foresters in two first-class matches in 1961 and 1962. He also captained the Royal Air Force cricket team and played for the Combined Services cricket team, as well as representing the Marylebone Cricket Club, as a right-handed batsman and right-arm medium-fast bowler.

He served as President of the RAF and Combined Services cricket clubs. He succeeded Lieutenant-Colonel Peter Packham as Secretary of Middlesex County Cricket Club in 1989, and retired in 1997.

Hardstaff died on 22 November 2022, aged 87.

References

1935 births
2022 deaths
English cricketers
English cricket administrators
Members of the Order of the British Empire
Secretaries of Middlesex County Cricket Club
People from Kirkby-in-Ashfield
Cricketers from Nottinghamshire
Royal Air Force officers